The angle of list is the degree to which a vessel heels (leans or tilts) to either port or starboard at equilibrium—with no external forces acting upon it. If a listing ship goes beyond the point where a righting moment will keep it afloat, it will capsize and potentially sink.

Listing is caused by the off-centerline distribution of weight aboard due to uneven loading or to flooding.

By contrast, roll is the dynamic movement from side to side caused by waves.

See also
Angle of loll
Heeling (sailing)
Capsizing
Metacentric height
Ship stability
Ship motions

References

Engineering concepts
Naval architecture
Ship measurements